Němčice is a municipality and village in Kolín District in the Central Bohemian Region of the Czech Republic. It has about 400 inhabitants.

References

Villages in Kolín District